Paweł Bryliński (21 June 1814 in Wieruszów – 18 April 1890 in Masanów) was a Polish folk-sculptor. He is perhaps best known for a series of works concerning Holy Week.

References

Bibliography
 Patricia M. Cmielewski (Patricia Margaret), 1921-2014 "Paweł Bryliński : a wandering folk sculptor 1814-1890", Bondi, N.S.W, 2006,  
 Ewa Chmielewska, "Święci na polskich rozstajach - południowa Wielkopolska", Ostrów Wlkp./Latowice, 2002.

1814 births
People from Wieruszów
Polish sculptors
Polish male sculptors
1890 deaths
19th-century sculptors